Barking Hoop Recordings is an independent record label founded by percussionist Kevin Norton in 1999.  The label is dedicated to releasing new and original music.  Barking Hoop has released music by Anthony Braxton, Joëlle Léandre, and the String Trio of New York with Oliver Lake.

Discography
 For Guy Debord (in nine events), Kevin Norton Ensemble featuring Anthony Braxton
 In Context/Out of Context, Kevin Norton's Context Trio
 Sous Ratue, Kevin O'Neil Quartet
 8 Standards (Wesleyan) 2001, Anthony Braxton Quartet
 Change Dance (Troubled Energy), Kevin Norton
 Kevin Norton and Haewon Min play the music of Anthony Braxton
 Ocean of Earth, Kevin Norton/Joelle Leandre/Tomas Ulrich
 Time Space Modulator, Kevin Norton's Bauhaus Quartet
 Frozen Ropes, String Trio of New York featuring Oliver Lake
 Born in Brooklyn, Instinctual Eye: Kevin Norton, Frode Gjerstad, Nick Stephens
 Hybrids, Billy Stein Trio
 Yimba Rudo, Yimba Rudo (Kevin Norton, Jim Pugliese, Steve LaSpina) (released July 2019)

See also
 List of record labels

References

External links
 Official website

American independent record labels
Record labels established in 1999
Jazz record labels
1999 establishments in the United States